"Distance～君とのキョリ" is South Korean boy band SS501's second Japanese maxi single. It was released barely a month after their successful first single, Kokoro.

The album consists of three songs, "Distance～君とのキョリ", "Gleaming Star", and "Wonderful World" and an instrumental version of each track. For the limited edition, they included the Japanese version of "Coward" from their first Korean studio album, S.T 01 Now.

Track listing

 NOTE: For the limited editions, "Wonderful World" track is not available.

Music videos
 "Distance～君とのキョリ"

Release history

References

External links

 
 

SS501 songs
2007 singles
2007 songs
Pony Canyon singles
Songwriter unknown